Mik Duffy is a writer from Armagh, Northern Ireland. Currently residing in Belfast, he writes mainly for and about film.

Filmography
 Brody Mullet: Boxkicker (2006)
 Hitch (2005/II)
 Mortice (1999)
 Flying Saucer Rock'n'Roll (1997)
 The Eliminator (1996)
 Necromentary (1995)
 Night of the Living Middle Income Bracket (1992)

References

External links
 Mik Duffy on Myspace
 
 

Living people
Year of birth missing (living people)
Male writers from Northern Ireland
People from County Armagh
Irish film critics
Alumni of the University of Stirling
21st-century writers from Northern Ireland